L.A.B. II is the second studio album by New Zealand band L.A.B., released in December 2018.

Production
The album was recorded at the Surgery Studios in Wellington, New Zealand, the home studio of Dr Lee Prebble, in the year since the release of their debut album  L.A.B. in November 2017. The band lived full-time at Surgery Studios while writing and recording the album.

Release and promotion
The album was announced on 7 December 2018, alongside the release of the album's first single "Midnight Summer". The album's second single, "Free Fall in a Dream", was released the following week on 14 December. L.A.B. toured New Zealand between December 2018 and March 2019, performing at events including Rhythm & Vines, Soundsplash Festival and One Love Festival. In May 2019, the album's final single "Baby Will You Let Me" was released, accompanied by a music video directed by Shae Sterling.

In 2020, the album track "Rocketship" began charting in New Zealand, and was certified platinum later that year.

Critical reception
Due to the release of L.A.B. II, the band were nominated for two awards at the 2019 New Zealand Music Awards: Best Roots Artist and Best Group.

Track listing

Credits and personnel
A. Adams-Tamatea – arrangement (10–11), backing vocals (12), bass (1, 5, 7–12), moog bass synthesiser (2–4, 6), songwriting (10–11)
Miharo Gregory – backing vocals (7), clavinet (10), piano (1)
Lucien Johnson – saxophone (10)
B. Kora – acoustic drums (4), arrangement (1, 4, 8, 10–11), backing vocals (2, 7, 12), drum programming (3–4, 6), drums (1–2, 5, 7–12), lyrics (1–3, 5–12), percussion (5), producer, songwriting (1–2, 4–7, 9–12), string arrangement (3)
Laughton Kora – backing vocals (9)
S. Kora – arrangement (4, 8, 10–11), backing vocals (5, 12), keys (1, 4–5, 7, 9–10, 12), organ (5, 10), rhythm guitar (1–2, 5, 7, 10–11), songwriting (4, 10–11), synthesiser (2–3, 6, 9, 12)
L.A.B. – arrangement (2–3, 5–7, 9, 12), songwriting (3)
Barrett Mocking – trumpet (10)
Dr Lee Prebble – co-producer
J. Shadbolt – acoustic guitar (3, 8), arrangement (4, 8), electric guitar (8), lead guitar (1, 5, 7, 10, 12), lead vocals (2–3, 6–12), lead vocoder (2), lyrics (2, 4), rhythm guitar (6, 9), songwriting (4, 7–8), vocals (1, 5)
Lisa Tomlins – backing vocals (10)

Charts

Weekly charts

Year-end charts

Certifications

Release history

References

2018 albums
L.A.B. albums